Javier Rey (born 25 February 1980) is a Spanish actor. He is popular for his performance in the television series Fariña.

Biography 
Born in Noia, Galicia on 25 February 1980. He was an avid comic book collector before starting his acting career. He landed a notable role in 2001 with a stage performance in the theatrical play Ubú rey. He had his television debut in the 2005 series Al filo de la ley, performing Darío, a flirt of the Nadia de Santiago's character. He had his debut in a feature film in 2008 with his performance in 8 citas. Often cast in supporting roles, he became a sought actor in lead roles in Spanish drama fiction after his performance in Velvet and particularly after his breakthrough role as Sito Miñanco in the 2018 series Fariña.

Filmography 
Television

Film

Awards and nominations

References 

21st-century Spanish male actors
Spanish male film actors
Spanish male television actors
Male actors from Galicia (Spain)
1980 births
Living people